McKinley may refer to:

People 
 William McKinley (1843–1901), 25th president of the United States
 McKinley (surname)
 McKinley Washington Jr. (1938–2022), American Presbyterian minister and politician

Places 
Philippines
 Fort William McKinley (now Fort Bonifacio) in Metro Manila
 McKinley Road, a major thoroughfare in Metro Manila
United States
 Mount McKinley (officially Denali) highest mountain peak in North America, in Alaska
 McKinley, Alabama
 McKinley, Indiana
 McKinley, Elk County, Pennsylvania
 McKinley, Montgomery County, Pennsylvania
 McKinley County, New Mexico
 McKinley Township, Emmet County, Michigan
 McKinley Township, Huron County, Michigan
 McKinley, Minnesota (disambiguation) (multiple)
 McKinley, Oregon
 McKinley, Wisconsin (disambiguation) (multiple)

Other uses
 Itanium 2, codenamed McKinley, an Intel microprocessor
 McKinley, a sporting goods brand produced by Intersport

See also
MacKinley
McKinlay
MacKinlay